Caravan Suite is an album of compositions by Duke Ellington performed by pianist Paul Bley which was recorded in Denmark in 1992 and released on the SteepleChase label.

Reception

The Penguin Guide to Jazz wrote that the "piano is very crisp and exact, suiting the material admirably."

Track listing 
All compositions by Duke Ellington
 "Caravan Suite:" – 32:57
 "Section 1" – 7:21
 "Section 2" – 7:40
 "Section 3" – 8:55
 "Section 4" – 7:02
 "I Got It Bad (and That Ain't Good)" – 7:30
 "(In My) Solitude" – 11:06
 "I'm Beginning to See the Light" – 6:17

Personnel 
Paul Bley – piano

References 

1993 albums
Paul Bley albums
SteepleChase Records albums
Duke Ellington tribute albums
Solo piano jazz albums